Bill Davis is a former NASCAR car owner that won the Daytona 500 with Ward Burton in 2002, and the 2001 Southern 500, also with Burton. His former team, Bill Davis Racing, fielded the #22 Caterpillar Inc. Toyota Camry and the #23 & #27 Camrys in the Sprint Cup series, as well as Toyotas in the Camping World Truck Series for Mike Skinner, Tyler Walker, Johnny Benson, Bill Lester, and others. Davis was listed as owner of the #77 Penske Dodge in the Sprint Cup series, driven by Sam Hornish Jr. in 2008.

Davis built his personal fortune through his ownership of Bill Davis Trucking, which he shut down in 2007 after filing Chapter 11 bankruptcy.

Davis sold his engines and team to Triad Racing Technologies in late 2008.

See also
Biography  at NASCAR.com

References

Year of birth missing (living people)
Living people
NASCAR team owners